Zhejiang University of Finance and Economics (abbreviated ZUFE; ; also colloquially referred to as  ) is an institution of higher education located in Hangzhou, China. The university specializes in economic disciplines and provides education in science, law, and the humanities. In the 2022 Times Higher Education World University Rankings, ZUFE ranked 801-1000.

History
The university was founded in December 1974 as the Zhejiang Academy of Public Finance and Banking. It has changed its name and campus several times. During its first year, many students rented houses from nearby silk farms. In 1987, the State Education Commission renamed it the Zhejiang Institute of Finance and Economics. It was authorized to grant bachelor's degrees starting in 1991, master's degrees in 2003 and doctoral degrees in National Special Needs Service Personnel Training Projection in 2012. ZUFE received its current name in 2013, when it was approved by the Ministry of Education of the People's Republic of China.

Facilities
ZUFE includes three campuses: its main campus, Xiasha Campus, Wenhua Campus and Chang’an campus. Its accreditation allows enrollment of international students as well as students from Hong Kong and Macao. More than 24,000 full-time undergraduates and postgraduates study there. The university owns fixed assets as valuable as $1.647 billion, 10% of which are allocated towards teaching- and research-related equipment and facilities. It operates 71 specialized laboratories. The university library holds a collection of over 2.33 million volumes, 2035 academic journals, 4.67 million e-books, and 30,000 e-journals.

Staff
ZUFE has 1,326 facility and staff members, of whom, 910 are academic staff, including 155 professors and 324 associate professors.

Research
ZUFE has received six "Excellent Research Achievement Awards" in the humanities and social sciences from the Ministry of Education and 24 other province- or ministry-level research achievement awards. University research has included a major project of the National Social Science Fund, 2 sub-projects of the National Science and Technology Major Project, 103 projects of the National Social Science Fund and National Natural Science Fund, a major project of the Key Projects of Philosophy and Social Sciences Research of the Ministry of Education, and 378 other province- or ministry-level projects on humanities and social sciences. The number of projects rank highest among Zhejiang's provincial universities. The university has published 2,769 academic papers in the journals indexed by CSSCI, in areas including economic research, management world and philosophical researchers, as well as 218 academic monographs. The two publications issued by the university, Collected Essays on Finance and Economics and Year Book of The Non-Public Sectors of The Economy in Zhejiang are published openly. The former is listed as one of the National Top 100 journals of social sciences, Chinese core journals, Chinese university core journals of humanities and social sciences and Chinese Social Science Citation Index (CSSCI) journals.

Notable people
Notable alumni have included:
Huang Xuming - former vice-governor of Zhejiang province
Chu Ziyu - Party Secretary and Director of the Zhejiang Provincial Department of Culture and Tourism and the Party Secretary of the Zhejiang Conservatory of Music
Mao Zijun - Chinese actor
Jacob Mardell - journalist and researcher at the Mercator Institute for China Studies
Marco Förster - Chair of the SME Forum of the European Union Chamber of Commerce in China

Notable professors include:
Sha Zukang - Chinese diplomat and head of the United Nations Department of Economic and Social Affairs from 2007 to 2012
Peng Lei - co-founder of Alibaba Group and former CEO of Ant Financial

Partner universities
Shih Hsin University
Laurentian University

References

External links
Official Website in Simplified Chinese

Universities and colleges in Hangzhou
Business schools in China
Educational institutions established in 1974
1974 establishments in China